The Thai Sang Thai Party is a Thai political party founded in 2021 by people from Pheu Thai Party led by Sudarat Keyuraphan.

History 
The registration of the new party took place on 23 March 2021, and Tai San Tai officially began its activities with an event on 10 December 2021, which considered the policy of the party. On 22 March 2022, the party decided to nominate aviation officer Sita Tiwaree as candidate for governor of Bangkok in 2022. Along with the nomination of candidates for the Bangkok Council in all 50 constituencies on 30 March.

In July 2022, following the news that several party members had returned to Pheu Thai Party, Keyuraphan stated that this was not a problem and the party would continue its work in full.

Electoral results

Regional elections

References 

Political parties established in 2021
Political parties in Thailand